Bixton may refer to:

Walter Bixton, MP for Norwich (UK Parliament constituency)
Rudi Bixton, character played by Omar Benson Miller in American TV series Law & Order: Special Victims Unit
Sally Bixton, a character in the 1971 American TV film A Howling in the Woods

See also
Buxton (surname)